The 1977 Romika Cup was a men's tennis tournament played on outdoor clay courts at the MTTC Iphitos in Munich, West Germany. It was part of the 1977 Grand Prix tennis circuit and categorized as a Two Star event. The tournament was held from 26 April through 1 May 1977. Željko Franulović won the singles title.

Finals

Singles

 Željko Franulović defeated  Víctor Pecci Sr. 6–1, 6–1, 6–7, 7–5
 It was Franulović's only title of the year and the 13th of his career.

Doubles

 František Pala /  Balázs Taróczy defeated  Nikola Špear /  John Whitlinger 6–3, 6–4
 It was Pala's only title of the year and the 1st of his career. It was Taróczy's only title of the year and the 3rd of his career.

References

External links 
 ATP tournament profile
 ITF tournament edition details
 

 
Bavarian International Tennis Championships
Romika Cup
Romika Cup
Romika Cup
Romika Cup